The Selandian is a stage in the Paleocene. It is preceded by the Danian and followed by the Thanetian. Sometimes the Paleocene is subdivided in subepochs, in which the Selandian forms the "middle Paleocene".

Stratigraphic definition
The Selandian was introduced in scientific literature by Danish geologist Alfred Rosenkrantz in 1924. It is named after the Danish island of Zealand (Danish: Sjælland) given its prevalence there. 

The base of the Selandian is close to the boundary between biozones NP4 and NP5. It is slightly after the first appearances of many new species of the calcareous nanoplankton genus Fasciculithus (F. ulii, F. billii, F. janii, F. involutus, F. tympaniformis and F. pileatus) and close to the first appearance of calcareous nanoplankton species Neochiastozygus perfectus. At the original type location in Denmark the base of the Selandian is an unconformity. The official GSSP was established in the Zumaia section (43° 18'N, 2° 16'W) at the beach of Itzurun in the Basque Country,  northern Spain.

The top of the Selandian (the base of the Thanetian) is laid at the base of magnetic chronozone C26n.

The Selandian Stage overlaps with the lower part of the Tiffanian North American Land Mammal Age, the Peligran, Tiupampan and lower Itaboraian South American Land Mammal Ages and part of the Nongshanian Asian Land Mammal Age. It is coeval with the lower part of the Wangerripian Stage from the Australian regional timescale.

The start of the Selandian represents a sharp depositional change in the North Sea Basin, where there is a shift to siliciclastic deposition due to the uplift and erosion of the Scotland-Shetland area after nearly 40 million years of calcium carbonate deposition. This change occurs at the same time as the onset of a foreland basin formation in Spitsbergen due to compression between Greenland and Svalbard, suggesting a common tectonic cause that altered the relative motions of the Greenland Plate and the Eurasian Plate. This plate reorganisation event is also manifest as a change in seafloor spreading direction in the Labrador Sea around this time.

Fauna and Flora
The fauna of the Selandian consisted of giant snakes (Titanoboa), crocodiles, champsosaurs, Gastornithiformes,  owls; and a few archaic forms of mammals, such as Mesonychids, Pantodonts, primate relatives Plesiadapids, and Multiberculates.

The flora was composed of cacti, ferns, and palm trees.

References

Further reading

External links 
GeoWhen Database - Selandian
Paleogene timescale, at the website of the subcommission for stratigraphic information of the ICS
Stratigraphic chart of the Paleogene, at the website of Norges Network of offshore records of geology and stratigraphy

 
Paleocene geochronology
 
Geological ages